Judah Katz (born June 23, 1960) is a Canadian actor born in Montreal, Quebec. He has worked in Toronto and Los Angeles for more than 30 years, appearing in both TV series and films.

Winning an ACTRA award (now called a Gemini Award) for his very first foray in front of a camera in 1983 as "best new actor in Canadian Television", he also received a Gemini for "best supporting actor" for his role as Alan Eagleson in the CBC mini-series Canada Russia '72.

Katz studied acting for two years at Vanier College, three years at the Dome Professional Theatre School, Banff School of Fine Arts, the "voice doctor" Robert Easton of Los Angeles, and since 1992 with renowned film and television acting coach and teacher David Rotenberg.

Filmography

References

External links
 

1960 births
Living people
Canadian male film actors
Canadian male television actors
Male actors from Montreal
Jewish Canadian male actors
Best Supporting Actor in a Television Film or Miniseries Canadian Screen Award winners